Jean Jacques Rousseau Randall, usually known as J. J. R. Randall, was an architect, civil engineer and politician from Rutland, Vermont. He was one of the first professional architects to practice in the state, after Ammi B. Young (1830-1838) and his brother, Gurdon P. Randall (1845-1850).

Life and career
J. J. R. Randall was born in Braintree, Vermont in 1828 to Gurdon and Laura Scott Randall, natives of Litchfield, Connecticut. His siblings included Francis V. Randall, Union Army officer of the American Civil War.

Randall initially worked with his brother, Gurdon P. Randall, in his office in Rutland. When his brother relocated to Syracuse, New York in 1850, he succeeded to the practice. He would continue in this business for much of his life. In 1864 his practice suffered a major setback when the building in which he kept his office was destroyed in a fire.

In 1869 Randall became associated with Kellogg, Clarke & Company, iron bridge manufacturers of Phoenixville, Pennsylvania. He and another new partner, James E. Bagley, established a branch for that firm at Springfield, Massachusetts. The following year he severed his connection with that firm and returned to Rutland. In 1877 the Imperial government of Russia approached him with an offer of employment to design a system of railroad bridges in the empire, though it is not clear if he accepted.

He was a member of Rutland's board of school trustees for many years. Randall was active in Democratic politics, and in 1876 he was a candidate for the United States Congress. When Grover Cleveland was elected president in 1885, he appointed Randall national bank examiner for Vermont. He held this position until suffering paralysis in 1887. He died in West Randolph, Vermont on September 4, 1891.

Personal life
Randall married Elizabeth C. Bailey of Rutland in 1859, who died in 1865. In 1874 he married Harriet Elizabeth Forbush of Montpelier, who survived him.

Legacy
Randall was responsible for the design of at least one building that is listed on the United States National Register of Historic Places, and others which contribute to listed historic districts.

Architectural works

References

Architects from Vermont
1828 births
1891 deaths